Julia Eccleshare MBE (born 1951) is a British journalist and writer on the subject of children's books. She has been Children's Books editor for The Guardian newspaper for more than ten years, at least from 2000. She is also an editorial contributor and advisor for the website Love Reading 4 Kids. She is a recipient of the Eleanor Farjeon Award.

Life and career 
Eccleshare was born in Cambridge and grew up in North London, the third of four children of Colin Eccleshare, a publisher with Cambridge University Press, and Liz, a history teacher.

Eccleshare was children's book editor of the Times Literary Supplement from 1974 to 1978.  

She served as non-fiction and picture book editor at Penguin Books children's imprint Puffin Books from 1978 to 1980, and as fiction editor at Hamish Hamilton children's books from 1980 to 1984, before returning to freelance book reviewing.

She selected hundreds of books for Children's Books of the Year from 1985 to 1993. The annual exhibition and annotated list had been established circa 1970 by the National Book League (later renamed Booktrust) and had missed one year before its 1985 resumption. 

Eccleshare has also served on many book award panels including the Whitbread Children's Book Award in 2001, and chaired the Nestlé Smarties Book Prize panel from 2001 to its conclusion in 2007.  In 2000 she co-founded the Branford Boase Award for an outstanding novel for young people by a first-time writer, and continues to chair its panel of judges.
At least from 2000 to 2012, she chairs the panel of three children's writers who judge the Guardian Children's Fiction Prize.

In 2000 she won the Eleanor Farjeon Award in recognition of "her outstanding contribution to children's books".

Eccleshare is currently children's books editor for The Guardian newspaper, and also regularly appears on BBC Radio 4's Open Book and Front Row programmes.
In 2014 she was appointed Head of Policy and Advocacy for Public Lending Right. 
She was appointed Member of the Order of the British Empire (MBE) in the 2014 Birthday Honours for services to children's literature.
She was an awarded an Honorary Doctor of Letters (DLitt, Hons) by the University of Worcester in 2014.
  
She is married and has four children, and lives in London.

Books
Eccleshare covered the Harry Potter series for Continuum (Contemporary classics of children's literature) when four volumes were in print. Following an introduction on "major success in children's books", Enid Blyton and others, she interpreted the Potter stories (part 2) and the Potter phenomenon including its impact on writing for children (parts 3–5).

Selected works 
 Children's Books of the Year, 1985; 1986; 1987; 1988; 1989; 1990; 1991; 1992; 1993 (London: National Book League/Booktrust/Children's Book Foundation; in association with Andersen Press from 1988) —catalogues of the annual exhibition
 Treasure Islands: the Woman's Hour guide to Children's reading (BBC Books, 1988)
 British literature for young people: a bibliography 1990–2000 (British Council, 2001)
 A guide to the Harry Potter novels (Continuum, 2002, Contemporary Classics of Children's Literature series)
 Beatrix Potter to Harry Potter: portraits of children's writers (National Portrait Gallery, 2002) —catalogue of an exhibition
 The Rough Guide to books for teenagers (London: Rough Guides, 2002), by Eccleshare and Nicholas Tucker —"more than 200 books reviewed"
 1001 children's books you must read before you grow up (Cassell, 2009)

References

External links

 

1951 births
Living people
British literary critics
British women literary critics
British women journalists
Children's literature criticism
Date of birth missing (living people)
Members of the Order of the British Empire
The Guardian journalists